The Eastern Ranges is an Australian rules football team in the NAB League, the Victorian statewide under-18s competition.

The club is a founding member of the competition (1992) and has produced several players for the Australian Football League including Kade Simpson, Rory Sloane, Nick Malceski, David Wirrpanda, Jess Sinclair, Damian Cupido, Lindsay Gilbee, Chris Scott, Brad Scott, Matthew Bate, Jonathon Patton, Chris Knights, Jaidyn Stephenson, and Hayden Crozier.

Honours
Premiers (2): 2002, 2013
Runners-up (5): 1995, 2000, 2004, 2015, 2019
Wooden Spoons (1): 2012
Morrish Medallists: Matthew Bate (2004), Ben Cavarra (2013)
TAC Cup Coach Award Winners: Jason Snell (1995), Tim Finocchairo (1996), Blake Grima (2002), Rory Sloane (2008)
Grand Final Best-on-Ground Medalists: Stephen Dinnell (2002), Ben Cavarra (2013)

Draftees
1992: Mark Attard, Jeremy McVay, Jason Disney
1993: Brad Nicholson, Chris Scott, Rayden Tallis, Paul Mullarvey, Daniel Hargreaves
1994: Brett Chandler, Mark Cullen, Damien Ryan, Brad Scott, Adam White, Emil Parthenides, Matthew Banks
1995: Clinton King, Kane Johnson, Nick Trask, Jason Snell, Kane Fraser
1996: David Wirrpanda, Jess Sinclair, Adam Kingsley
1997: Andrew Pugsley, Mark Bolton, Jason Saddington, Brett Rose, Tim Finocchairo, Fred Campbell
1998: Troy Simmonds
1999: Damien Cupido, Scott Homewood, Michael Clark, Lindsay Gilbee, Simon Godfrey, Marc Skidmore
2000: none
2001: Richard Cole, Kieran McGuiness
2002: Blake Grima, Brad Fisher, Cameron Cloke, Greg Edgcombe, Joel Perry, Kade Simpson, Kris Shore, Nick Malceski
2003: Daniel McConnell
2004: Matthew Bate, Fabian Deluca, Travis Cloke, Chris Knights
2005: Matthew Spangher
2006: Leigh Adams
2007: Matthew Lobbe
2008: Sam Blease, Liam Shiels, Rory Sloane, Nathan O'Keefe
2009: Andrew Moore, Jordan Gysberts, Ben Griffiths, Ayden Kennedy
2010: Kieran Harper, Aaron Young, Cam O'Shea, Paul Seedsman
2011: Jonathon Patton, Hayden Crozier, Aaron Mullett
2012: none
2013: Thomas Boyd, Michael Apeness, Daniel McStay, Mitch Honeychurch
2014: Christian Petracca, Daniel Nielson
2015: Blake Hardwick, Ryan Clarke, Sam Weideman
2016: Jordan Gallucci, Josh Begley, Callum Brown, Jack Maibaum, Dylan Clarke, Nathan Mullenger-McHugh, Tristan Tweedie
2017: Adam Cerra, Jaidyn Stephenson, Sam Hayes, Tyler Brown, Ryley Stoddart, Joel Garner, Tom North, Dylan Moore, Jackson Ross, Trent Mynott
2018: none
2019: none
2020: Connor Downie
2021: Tyler Sonsie, Jake Soligo, Flynn Kroeger
2022: Lewis Hayes

External links

Eastern Ranges - TAC Cup website
Official Eastern Ranges website
Match report

NAB League clubs
NAB League Girls clubs
Sport in the City of Whitehorse
Australian rules football clubs in Melbourne
1992 establishments in Australia
Australian rules football clubs established in 1992